Francis Xavier Ryan (born May 1, 1951) is an American politician, accountant, and retired military officer who served as a member of the Pennsylvania House of Representatives for the 101st District from 2017 to 2022.

Early life and education
Ryan was born on May 1, 1951 in Baltimore, Maryland. He graduated from Fairfield High School in 1969. Ryan graduated summa cum laude with a Bachelor of Arts degree from Mount St. Mary's University in 1973, and a Master of Business Administration from the University of Maryland in 1977. He is a Certified Public Accountant.

Military service
Ryan began his service in the United States Marine Corps Reserves in 1969, and retired at the rank of colonel in 2002. He was recalled to active duty in 2004, serving with the Multi-National Force – Iraq until the following year. He had previously served as Central Command Special Operations Officer during Operation Enduring Freedom in 2002. In total Ryan received three Legions of Merit, the Bronze Star Medal, the Defense Meritorious Service Medal, the Navy Commendation Medal, and the United States Army Commendation Medal.

Political career
Ryan worked on Pat Toomey's first United States Senate campaign. He also worked at the Pennsylvania Department of Labor & Industry and the U.S. Department of Labor.

Pennsylvania House of Representatives
Ryan was first elected to represent the 101st District in the Pennsylvania House of Representatives in 2016, and won re-election in 2018 and 2020.

In 2020, Ryan was among 26 Pennsylvania House Republicans who called for the reversal of Joe Biden's certification as the winner of Pennsylvania's electoral votes in the 2020 United States presidential election, citing false claims of election irregularities.

In 2021, he proposed an amendment to a bill whereby only elected officials in Philadelphia, a Democratic stronghold, could be recalled. Prior to Ryan's amendment, the bill allowed for recalls of elected officials statewide.

In 2022, Ryan announced he would not seek reelection to a fourth term.

Personal life
Ryan is married to his wife, Sherrie. He has four children and nine grandchildren.

Electoral history

References

External links

1951 births
Living people
21st-century American politicians
American male writers
Republican Party members of the Pennsylvania House of Representatives
Mount St. Mary's University alumni
University of Maryland, College Park alumni
United States Marine Corps colonels
United States Marine Corps reservists
Recipients of the Legion of Merit